The 1928 municipal election was held December 10, 1928 to elect a mayor and six aldermen to join Edmonton City Council and three trustees to join the public school board during the year of 1929 and 1930. Three trustees were elected by acclamation to join the separate school board for 1929 and 1930.

There were also six bylaws put to a citywide vote.

10 aldermen sat on city council at any one time. Four of the positions were already filled: Ralph Bellamy, A C Sloane, James East, and L S C Dineen were all elected to two-year terms in 1927 and were still in office.  John C. Bowen had also been elected to a two-year term, but had resigned in order to run for mayor.  Rice Sheppard (SS) was elected in the 1928 election to finish his term.

Labour did well in this election, electing four new alderman (counting farmer activist Sheppard) to add to East and Dineen who were continue to serve in 1929. These six out of 11 seats would give Labour a majority position in 1929.

There were seven trustees on the public school board, but four of the positions were already filled:   Frank Crang (SS), Arthur Cushing, Albert Ottewell (SS), and Elmer Roper had all been elected to two-year terms in 1927 and were still in office.  The same was true on the separate board, where Robert Crossland (SS), Charles Gariepy, Thomas Magee, and B J Tansey (SS) were continuing.

This election marked Edmonton's return to the at-large Plurality block voting and first past the post electoral systems, under which each voter had as many votes as there were seats to fill and there were no wards to divide the city voters, after five elections of using single transferable vote/PR for aldermanic elections and Instant-runoff voting for mayoral contests where more than two candidates were in the running.

Voter turnout

14,971 voters cast ballots, out of 37,915 eligible voters, for a voter turnout of 39.4%. (The vote count is much more than the number of ballots cast due to the block-voting system in use for election of councillors and school trustees.)

Results

 bold or  indicates elected
 italics indicate incumbent
 "SS", where data is available, indicates representative for Edmonton's South Side, with a minimum South Side representation instituted after the city of Strathcona, south of the North Saskatchewan River, amalgamated into Edmonton on February 1, 1912.

Mayor

Aldermen

Public school trustees

Separate (Catholic) school trustees

A J Crowe (SS), J O Pilon, and W D Trainor were acclaimed.

Money Bylaws
 Money items required a minimum two-thirds "Yes" majority to approve the expenditure

$86,525 for paving

Yes - 4,305
No - 824

$50,000 for gravelling

Yes - 4,288
No - 802

$23,860 for airport improvements

Yes - 3,065
No - 1,692

$292,688 for a hospital

Yes - 4,362
No - 998

$50,000 for a firehall

Yes - 3,735
No - 1,169

$100,000 for fire equipment

Yes - 4,044
No - 935

References

Election History, City of Edmonton: Elections and Census Office

1928
1928 elections in Canada
1928 in Alberta